The USS St. Andrews (CVE-49) (originally AVG-49, later ACV-49) was assigned to MC hull 260 on 23 August 1942, a ship to be built to modified C3-S-A1 plans.  She was laid down on 12 March 1943 by the Seattle-Tacoma Shipbuilding Corporation of Tacoma, Washington; redesignated CVE-49 on 15 July; and launched on 31 July; sponsored by Mrs. Robert W. Morse; transferred to the United Kingdom under Lend-Lease on 7 December; and commissioned the same day as HMS Queen (D19) in the Royal Navy.

HMS Queen served British and Allied escort forces in protecting the vital convoy supply effort across the North Atlantic in 1944, and in the Pacific campaigns in 1945.  On 4 May 1945 aircraft of Queens 853 Squadron, Fleet Air Arm, took part in Operation Judgement, the last air-raid of the European war, at Kilbotn, Norway.  After hostilities ceased, she was converted to a troop carrier and used to bring British forces back from the Far East, before being returned to the United States at Norfolk, Virginia, 31 October 1946.

On arrival, Queen was decommissioned by the Royal Navy and was taken over by the U.S. Navy.  In excess of Navy needs, CVE-49 was slated, in December, for disposal; struck from the Navy Register in July 1947, sold to the N.V. Stoomv, Maats, Nederland Co., Amsterdam, Netherlands and pressed into merchant service as Roebiah on 29 July 1947 (renamed President Marcos in 1967 and Lucky One in 1972).  She was scrapped in Taiwan in 1972.

Design and description
These ships were all larger and had a greater aircraft capacity than all the preceding American built escort carriers. They were also all laid down as escort carriers and not converted merchant ships.

Armament comprised: two 4"/50, 5"/38 or 5"/51 Dual Purpose guns in single mounts, sixteen 40 mm Bofors anti-aircraft guns in twin mounts and twenty 20 mm Oerlikon anti-aircraft cannons in single mounts. They had a maximum aircraft capacity of twenty-four aircraft which could be a mixture of Grumman Martlet, Vought F4U Corsair or Hawker Sea Hurricane fighter aircraft and Fairey Swordfish or Grumman Avenger anti-submarine aircraft.

Notes

References

 
The Attack on 'Black Watch''' (Harald Isachsen, Harstad, 2009,   -  in Norwegian)

External links
Retired CIP brings aircraft carrier back to life An article about David Weaver's detailed book History of HMS Queen''

 

Ships built in Tacoma, Washington
1943 ships
Ruler-class escort carriers